Mockbul Ali, OBE (born 6 March 1981) is a British diplomat and the current British Ambassador to the Dominican Republic and the Republic of Haiti.

Early life
Ali is of Bengali South Asian heritage and was born in the UK. He is a graduate of the School of Oriental and African Studies, University of London. He later completed his postgraduate studies at the  Royal College of Defence Studies, and has a master's degree in international security and strategy from King's College London.

Career
Ali joined the then Foreign and Commonwealth Office in 2002. He has held a number of roles in London, including as a policy adviser on the wider Muslim world to three former Foreign Secretaries. His overseas diplomatic postings have included Political Counsellor in Egypt, Chief of Staff to the British Prime Minister's Special Envoy to Libya and British Deputy Ambassador to Bahrain.

In 2019, he was appointed the British Ambassador to the Dominican Republic and Haiti.

Awards and recognition
In 2009, he was listed as one of The 500 Most Influential Muslims globally.

Ali was appointed an Officer of the Order of the British Empire (OBE) in the 2010 Queen’s Birthday Honours.

He also received the Royal College of Defence Studies Award for Strategic Leadership in 2014, and was the first civilian to do so.

Personal life
Ali is a British Muslim by background.

See also
British Diplomats

References

1981 births
Living people
Place of birth missing (living people)
English Muslims
English people of Bangladeshi descent
Civil servants from London
Diplomats from London
Political campaign staff
Labour Party (UK) officials
Alumni of SOAS University of London
Graduates of the Royal College of Defence Studies
Alumni of King's College London
Officers of the Order of the British Empire